Alida Yvette Gray (born April 12, 1977) is an American judoka and mixed martial artist.  She was born in North Hollywood, California, United States, and is of Russian, Jewish, and Mexican background.  She graduated from Cal. State University of San Bernardino.

Judo
Gray achieved notability for her success in judo, where she competed in the under 52 kg division.  She was second at the U.S. judo championships in 1994 and 1995, while finishing third in both 1996 and 1997. She was also the second alternate for the 1996 Atlanta Olympics after finishing third behind Marisa Pedulla and JoAnne Quiring.

MMA
Gray is currently 4-3 in professional MMA fighting, having previously fought against Jessica Aguilar for the inaugural World Series of Fighting women’s straw weight championship.

Mixed martial arts record

|-
|Loss
|align=center|4–3
|Angela Hill
|KO (knee to the body)
|Invicta FC 15: Cyborg vs. Ibragimova
|
|align=center|1
|align=center|1:39
|Costa Mesa, California, United States
|
|-
|Loss
|align=center|4–2
|Alexa Grasso
|TKO (punches)
|Invicta FC 10: Waterson vs. Tiburcio
|
|align=center|1
|align=center|1:47
|Houston, Texas, United States
|
|-
|Loss
|align=center|4–1
|Jessica Aguilar
|Submission (arm-triangle choke)
|WSOF 8 - Gaethje vs. Patishnock
|
|align=center|1
|align=center|2:45
|Florida, United States
|
|-
|Win
|align=center|4–0
|Katie Klimansky-Casimir
|TKO (punches)
|SCS 20 - Vinte
|
|align=center|1
|align=center|2:45
|Oklahoma, United States
|
|-
|Win
|align=center|3–0
|Soannia Tiem
|KO (punch)
|4/7 Entertainment 12 - State of Emergency
|
|align=center|3
|align=center|0:05
|Texas, United States
|
|-
|Win
|align=center|2–0
|Jessica Armstrong-Kennett
|TKO (punches and elbows)
|Rocktagon MMA 28 - Journey of Champions 1
|
|align=center|2
|align=center|2:40
|Texas, United States
|
|-
|Win
|align=center|1–0
|Patricia Vidonic
|Submission (armbar)
|SCS 17 - Mayhem
|
|align=center|2
|align=center|2:19
|Oklahoma, United States
|

See also
 List of Jews in sports#Judo

References

1977 births
Living people
American female judoka
American female mixed martial artists
Strawweight mixed martial artists
Sportspeople from El Paso, Texas
California State University, San Bernardino alumni
Mixed martial artists utilizing judo
American sportspeople of Mexican descent
American people of Russian descent
American people of Jewish descent
21st-century American women